Hořesedly is a municipality and village in Rakovník District in the Central Bohemian Region of the Czech Republic. It has about 400 inhabitants.

Geography
It lies in an agricultural landscape in the Rakovník Uplands.

History

The first written mention of Hořesedly is from 1316. From 1355 to 1418, it was property of the church at Prague Castle. In 1420, Hořesedly was shortly owned by a branch of the Kolowrat family, then it was confiscated from them by the royal chamber and passed on to various lesser nobles.

Transport
The I/6 road, part of the European route E48, passes through the municipality. It replaces the unfinished section of the D6 motorway from Prague to Karlovy Vary.

Sights
The main landmark of Hořesedly is the Church of Saint Lawrence. It is a small Baroque church from the early 18th century.

References

External links

Villages in Rakovník District